Albert Baker (28 November 1872 – 17 April 1948) was an English first-class cricketer who played for Surrey between 1900 and 1912, scoring 1,257 runs in 1905. He was born and died in Farnham.

References

1872 births
1948 deaths
English cricketers
Surrey cricketers
Ireland cricketers
Woodbrook Club and Ground cricketers
S. H. Cochrane's XI cricketers